The Brannovīcēs or Aulerci Brannovīcēs (Gaulish: *Brannouīcēs/Brannowīcēs) were a Gallic tribe dwelling in the modern Yonne department or the Saône valley during the Iron Age and the Roman period. They were part of the Aulerci.

Name 
The Gaulish ethnonym *Brannouīcēs/Brannowīcēs means 'those who vanquish by (or like) the crow'. It stems from the root brano- ('crow', cf. OIr., Welsh bran) attached to the suffix -uices ('victors').

In Caesar (B. G. vii. 75) there are also readings "Blannovicibus" and "Blannoviis" (Oudendorp. ed. Caes.)

Geography 
Walckenaer proposes to place the "Blannovices" or "Brannovices" in the district of Mâcon, where D'Anville also places the Brannovices or Brannovii. Walckenaer urges, in favor of this supposition, the existence of a place called Blannot in the district of Mâcon. There is another Blannot in the department of Côte d'Or, about 22 km from Arnay, and here Walckenaer places the Blannovii. The controversy has not been resolved.

References

Bibliography 

Historical Celtic peoples
Gauls
Tribes of pre-Roman Gaul
Tribes involved in the Gallic Wars
History of Yonne